Etz Efraim (lit. Tree of Ephraim) is a mixed (religious and nonreligious) Israeli settlement in the West Bank. Located between Ariel and Rosh HaAyin, it falls under the jurisdiction of Shomron Regional Council.

The international community considers Israeli settlements in the West Bank illegal under international law, but the Israeli government disputes this.

Etymology
The settlement was named for the Tribe of Ephraim, whose territory was in the area.

See also
Mas-ha

References

Israeli settlements in the West Bank
Populated places established in 1985
1985 establishments in the Israeli Civil Administration area